The manga series Wandering Son is written and illustrated by Takako Shimura. The chapters were serialized monthly in Comic Beam from the December 2002 to August 2013 issues. The chapters were collected and published in 15 tankōbon volumes by Enterbrain from July 25, 2003 to August 28, 2013. Fantagraphics Books licensed the manga in English and began releasing the series in North America in hardcover format starting with the first volume on July 5, 2011. The series is also licensed by Ever Glory Publishing in Taiwan and by Haksan Culture Company in Korea. The story depicts a young student named Shuichi Nitori, described by the author as a boy who wants to be a girl, and Shuichi's friend Yoshino Takatsuki, described as a girl who wants to be a boy. As the two of them grow up, they worry about the bodily changes they will be going through, and try to find their own way of life.


Volume list

References

External links

Lists of manga volumes and chapters